Jay Stephens (born March 22, 1971) is a Canadian cartoonist and animator currently living in Guelph, Ontario. He is best known as the creator of Discovery Kids's animated television series Tutenstein , Cartoon Network's The Secret Saturdays, and the JetCat animated shorts for Nickelodeon's anthology series, KaBlam!.

Aside from his work in animation, Jay is known for several comic book projects, including "SIN", "The Land of Nod", "Atomic City Tales", and "Jetcat Clubhouse", and has written and drawn for licensed properties such as 'Alien', 'Star Wars', 'Felix the Cat', and 'Teen Titans'. He is the author of several drawing books for kids, including "Monsters!: Draw Your Own Mutants, Freaks & Creeps", "Heroes!: Draw Your Own Superheroes, Gadget Geeks & Other Do-Gooders", "Robots!: Draw Your Own Androids, Cyborgs & Fighting Bots", and "Freaky Fun Activities". Jay Stephens is the creator of the comic strips, "Oddville!", "Chick & Dee" (for Chickadee magazine), "Xtra-curricular" (for OWL magazine), and the short-lived daily newspaper strip "Oh, Brother!" with Slylock Fox creator Bob Weber, Jr. ''

References

External links
Archive of official website taken May 17, 2014 (site is no longer functional)
Blog (Last updated on January 15, 2010)

 

1971 births
Living people
Artists from Toronto
Canadian cartoonists
Canadian comics artists
Canadian television directors
Canadian animated film directors
Film directors from Toronto